Stacey Katu (born 8 November 1983) is a former professional rugby league footballer who played for the Burleigh Bears in the Queensland Cup and the South Sydney Rabbitohs in the NRL. He also played for the Cook Islands national rugby league team.

References

External links 
 http://www.rleague.com/db/player/k/katu_stacey/index.php
RLP

Cook Island rugby league players
Cook Islands national rugby league team players
Living people
Burleigh Bears players
1983 births
Cook Island expatriate rugby league players
Expatriate rugby league players in Australia
Cook Island expatriates in Australia
South Sydney Rabbitohs players
Rugby league props